Pycniospores are a type of spore in fungi. They are produced in special cup-like structures called pycnia or pynidia.  Almost all fungi reproduce asexually with the production of spores.  Spores may be colorless, green, yellow, orange, red, brown or black.

Other types of spore

Sporangiospores
Sporangiospores (spore:spore, angion:sac) are spores formed inside the sporangium which is a spore sac. 

Conidia
Conidia (singular: conidium) are spores produced at the tip of special branches called conidiophores.

Oidia
Oidia (singular: oidium).  In several fungi, the hyphae is often divided into a large number of short pieces by transverse walls.  Each piece is able to germinate into a new body.  These pieces are called oidia (small egg).

Chlamydospores
Chlamydospores (chlymus: mantle) are produced like oidia but differ from oidia in being thick walled.  They are either terminal or intercalary.

References

Fungal morphology and anatomy
Mycology